Gaetano Vascellini (1745 - 1805) was an Italian engraver, active in a neoclassical style in his native Florence, Region of Tuscany, Italy. He was prolific in engraving portraits of the illustrious persons of Florence, as well as local sculpture.

References

Further reading 

1745 births
1805 deaths
Artists from Florence
Italian engravers